Laccobius cinereus is a species of water scavenger beetle in the family Hydrophilidae. It is found in Europe and Northern Asia (excluding China) and North America.

Subspecies
These two subspecies belong to the species Laccobius cinereus:
 Laccobius cinereus cinereus Motschulsky, 1860
 Laccobius cinereus columbianus Miller, 1965

References

Further reading

External links

 

Hydrophilinae
Articles created by Qbugbot
Beetles described in 1860